I-30 was a Type B1 submarine of the Imperial Japanese Navy during World War II. After operating in the Indian Ocean she participated in a Yanagi mission, aimed at connecting Japan and Nazi Germany by submarine. She was the first Japanese submarine to reach Europe, arriving at Lorient, France in August 1942. I-30 returned to Singapore loaded with military technology and information, but hit a mine outside the harbour and sank. Only part of her cargo was salvaged.

Service history
The submarine was laid down at the Kure Naval Arsenal on 7 June 1939, launched on 17 September 1940, completed on 28 February 1942, and commissioned with Commander Endo Shinobu in command.

Indian Ocean operations
On 27 March 1942 the German Kriegsmarine naval staff requested that the Imperial Navy launch operations against Allied convoys in the Indian Ocean, and on 8 April the Japanese agreed to dispatch a detachment of submarines to the East Coast of Africa. Submarine Squadron 8's 1st Division was withdrawn from its base at Kwajalein in the Marshall Islands and assigned the task.

On 11 April, I-30 departed Kure for Penang, Malaya, arriving on the 20th. Two days later she sailed from Penang accompanied by the auxiliary cruiser and supply ship Aikoku Maru to reconnoitre selected points on the East African coast for possible attack. In May I-30 sailed along the coast of Africa, launching its Yokosuka E14Y floatplane on a series of reconnaissance flights over Aden, Zanzibar, Dar es Salaam, and Durban, East London, Port Elizabeth and Simon's Town in South Africa searching for targets.

On the night of 29 May I-30 she sent her aircraft to the harbour of Diego Suarez at the northern tip of Madagascar, which was occupied by the British. The next night the Type C submarines I-16 and I-20 launched their Ko-hyoteki midget submarines about 10 miles from the harbour. At 20:25, one torpedoed and damaged the Ramillies. The corvettes counter-attacked with depth charges, but at 21:20 the midget from I-20 torpedoed and sank the British Loyalty. The I-16s midget submarine went missing, presumed sunk, while the I-20s beached further along the coast. Its two crewmen were discovered by Royal Marines, and in the ensuing firefight both were killed.

Voyage to Europe
In mid-June 1942 I-30 was sent on a Yanagi mission to Europe, rounding the Cape of Good Hope and entering the Atlantic en route to France. On 2 August she arrived in the Bay of Biscay and was escorted into Lorient by a powerful force of German M-class minesweepers and Luftwaffe Junkers Ju 88 bombers. I-30 was the first Japanese submarine to arrive in Europe during World War II.

The officers and crew of I-30 were greeted by Grossadmiral Erich Raeder, Admiral Karl Dönitz, and Captain Yokoi Tadao, the Japanese Naval Attaché to Germany. The officers and crew of I-30 were feted by their German allies, travelling to Berlin where Commander Endo was presented to Adolf Hitler, and returning to Lorient via a sightseeing trip to Paris. They also supplied the Germans with blueprints of the Type 91 aerial torpedo. In return I-30 was repainted U-boat grey and fitted with a Metox radar detector and a Flakvierling 38 quad 20 mm AA gun, replacing her Type 96 25 mm AA guns.

I-30 departed Lorient on 22 August carrying a Japanese engineer as a passenger. Her cargo included blueprints and a full set of the Würzburg air defense ground radar, five German G7a and three G7e torpedoes, five Torpedovorhalterechner (torpedo data computers), 240 Bolde sonar countermeasure rounds, rocket and glider bombs, anti-tank guns, a Zeiss anti-aircraft artillery director (fire control system), two hundred 20 mm AA guns, industrial diamonds valued at one million yen, and fifty Enigma T coding machines.

Sinking
On 8 October 1942 I-30 arrived at Penang to refuel and replenish, then sailed for Singapore, arriving early on the 13th. Just after 4 p.m. the same day, she departed for Japan, but three miles east of Keppel Harbour hit a British mine and quickly sank with the loss of 13 men. Divers from No. 101 Navy Repair Unit recovered some of her cargo, including most of the 20 mm guns, torpedo data computers, and the radar blueprints, though they were found to be unusable after their immersion in salt water. The radar equipment was completely destroyed.

Between August 1959 and February 1960 the wreck was salvaged and then scrapped by Hokusei Sempaku Kogyo K.K.

References

Bibliography

External links
 Wochenschau newsreel on the arrival of I-30 in Europe 
 An article with pictures related to I-30s mission 

Type B1 submarines
Ships built by Kure Naval Arsenal
1940 ships
World War II submarines of Japan
Ships sunk by mines
Japanese submarines lost during World War II
World War II shipwrecks in the Pacific Ocean
Maritime incidents in October 1942